Korea National University of Cultural Heritage is a national university located in Buyeo County, South Korea. Construction began in 1996, and the official opening ceremony was held on 2 March 2000.

See also
List of national universities in South Korea
List of universities and colleges in South Korea
Education in Korea

References

External links
 Official website 

National universities and colleges in South Korea
Universities and colleges in South Chungcheong Province
Educational institutions established in 2000
Buyeo County
2000 establishments in South Korea